Sevatha Ponnu is a 1994 Indian Tamil-language drama film, directed by A. Chandrakumar. The film stars Saravanan, Ahana and Vasu Vikram, while Vadivelu, S. S. Chandran, Srividya, Vennira Aadai Moorthy and Shanmugasundaram play supporting roles. It was released on 17 June 1994.

Plot
The film revolves around three people: Chellappa, Saroja and Sudalamani. Chellappa is a smart college student from a poor family who lives with his widow mother Thangamma. Saroja is the daughter of the village chief and arrogant Rasathi. Sudalamani is Saroja's relative and a womanizer who teases the village girls. He wants to marry Saroja to gain her property. One day, Chellappa beats up Sudalamani, and they land at Saroja's house. At the village court, Chellappa remains silent. Saroja, irritated by his reaction, gets him suspended from the college. She later learns that Chellappa saved a blind girl from the pervert Sudalamani, but Chellappa remains silent at the village court to protect the blind girl's privacy.

Later, Saroja wrongly accuses Chellappa of kidnapping her and holding her for a day. Chellappa accepts the blame and he says that he did much worse. The villagers advise Saroja to marry Chellappa. The shrewish Rasathi refuses and tries to find a bribe for her daughter, but nobody wanted to marry an unchaste woman. Only Sudalamani accepts for marriage, and they arrange their wedding. The day before their wedding, the villagers force Chellappa to marry Saroja. What transpires next forms the rest of the story.

Cast

Saravanan as Chellappa
Ahana as Saroja
Vasu Vikram as Sudalamani
Vadivelu
S. S. Chandran 
Srividya as Rasathi
Vennira Aadai Moorthy as Gnanadesikan
Shanmugasundaram
Ennatha Kannaiya
Idichapuli Selvaraj
Premi as Sudalamani's mother
Vaani as Thangamma
Pasi Narayanan as Madusamy
Thideer Kannaiah as Punniyakodi
Kumarimuthu
Thayir Vadai Desikan as Poosari
R. K. as Sudalamani's friend
Vellai Subbaiah as Marriage broker
Joker Thulasi
Bayilvan Ranganathan
M. L. A. Thangaraj
S. Sambar
Pavithra
Shobana
Ramanujam
Marthandan

Soundtrack

The music was composed by Deva, with lyrics written by Vaali.

Reception
The Indian Express wrote "the handling of the script is not all that bad, and the director has managed to keep a steady pace throughout".

References

External links 
 

1990s Tamil-language films
1994 drama films
1994 films
Films scored by Deva (composer)
Indian drama films